Red Butte Creek is a small stream whose headwaters are found in the northeast part of Salt Lake County, Utah, United States. It flows west through the Red Butte Garden and Arboretum, by the University of Utah, Fort Douglas and flows southwesterly to Salt Lake City’s Liberty Park. Despite  of the watershed, Red Butte Canyon is the smallest canyon of the seven canyons in eastern Salt Lake County.

History
During the early 1850s, Red Butte Canyon was considered a source of red sandstone to construct the LDS Salt Lake Temple. A wooden railroad was considered to transport the sandstone to the temple site, but the idea was abandoned in 1855 when it was decided to construct the Temple with granite located in Little Cottonwood Canyon. A monument constructed along the creek in the city's Yalecrest neighborhood commemorates Salt Lake's early pioneers drowning sacks of Mormon crickets in the creek during that era's notable infestation.

The first major use of Red Butte Creek water was by the United States Army at Fort Douglas, which was established at the mouth of the canyon in 1862. This utilization of water outside the canyon had little effect on the canyon itself, as U.S. Army administrators worked over many years to protect the watershed and water quality. Protection has grown steadily since Fort Douglas was first established and particularly since the canyon was acquired by the U.S. Forest Service in 1969 and declared to be a Research Natural Area.

Red Butte Creek was used for irrigation by a few pioneers east of Salt Lake City in the early 1850s. When Fort Douglas was established in 1862, Army personnel initially depended mostly on water from nearby springs. However, by 1875 Army personnel constructed two reservoirs east of Fort Douglas and diverted water from Red Butte Creek to fill them. In response to the recurrent stream pollution problems caused by quarrying activities, the Territory District Court, in 1890, declared that the waters of Red Butte Creek were the sole property of the U.S. Army and under the jurisdiction of Fort Douglas. Also, in 1890, the U.S. Congress passed a law to protect the water supply of Fort Douglas. This law prevented any sale of land in the canyon or further watershed development. In 1906 the Army built a dam on Red Butte Creek to supply additional water for Fort Douglas. The dam was constructed between 1928 and 1930, and the reservoir provided water for Fort Douglas until its closure in 1991.

Red Butte Creek is a perennial third-order stream without upstream regulation or diversion until the flow is collected in the reservoir located near the base of the canyon. The stream has created a narrow-based canyon with sides rising abruptly at an average slope of about 35 degrees to the north and about 40 degrees to the south.

Hydrology

The stream flow exhibits a straightforward annual pattern; characteristic of this geographic region-high, spring flows are driven by snowmelt followed by very much reduced flows derived from groundwater throughout the remainder of the year. Spring melt flow, typically an order of magnitude greater than other periods of the year, peaks in May and persists for six to eight weeks. Mean stream flow rates do not increase during the summer, although nearly one-fourth of the annual precipitation falls. Average monthly stream flow values, however, hide much of the stream dynamics and the resultant impact on riparian vegetation. Daily, stream flows can vary tremendously during snowmelt, depending on air temperatures and snowpack depth, primarily upper Red Butte Canyon and Knowltons Fork.

The 1982–83 winter was one of unusually high precipitation along the Wasatch Front. Heavy snows in mid-May 1983 were followed by equally unusual warm temperatures at the end of the month.

Ecosystem
The canyon is managed by the U.S. Forest Service as a protected reserve and is gated to prevent public access. This makes this watershed the most pristine area along the Wasatch Front. The Utah Field Office of the U.S. Fish and Wildlife Service reported that 400 endangered June sucker fish were planted in the reservoir, and they are thriving in 1994.

Chevron pipeline oil spill

On the morning of June 12, 2010, nearly 33,000 gallons of petroleum spilled into Red Butte Creek. A ruptured pipeline owned by Chevron Corporation burst on the creek outside Red Butte Garden and Arboretum. The spill was stopped by the afternoon, but not before the petroleum reached the Jordan River. Affected wildlife were transported to Hogle Zoo for treatment.

See also

 List of rivers of Utah

References

External links

Rivers of Utah
Rivers of Salt Lake County, Utah
Geography of Salt Lake City